Denny Chimes is a  tall campanile tower on the south side of The Quad at the University of Alabama, in Tuscaloosa, Alabama. The tower was named in honor of George H. Denny, who served as university president from 1912 to 1936 and then again from 1941 through 1942.  It is equipped with a 25-bell carillon.  The tower is one of the most visible landmarks on campus.

History
The idea of erecting a bell tower on the University of Alabama campus was initially suggested in 1919.  It was envisioned as a war memorial for those who fought in World War I. Due to a lack of funding for its construction, the project never materialized.

In the late 1920s, university students were finally successful in collecting the necessary funding to construct a tower, although not as a war memorial.  It was done in an effort to dedicate the structure to university president George Denny, after learning of a rumor that he was looking to leave the university and return to his native Virginia.

The tower was built by Skinner, Maxwell and Company at a final cost of $40,000. It was dedicated on May 27, 1929, with Governor Bibb Graves in attendance.

Design
The tower is Art Deco in design. The square white limestone base features pilasters at each corner, with a recessed bay in between.  The base is crowned by a molded cornice, which in turn is topped by an eagle, with partially outstretched wings, perched at each of the four corners, where the limestone base transitions to the brick shaft.  The base supports a red brick shaft that gradually tapers to a limestone crown featuring a belfry with square pillars separated by partially open neoclassical grills, all topped off by a stepped pyramidal roof of limestone.  The limestone was quarried in Alabama, while the bricks are from Virginia, in honor of Denny's home state.

Carillon
The Westminster chimes ring every 15 minutes, chiming on the hour in addition to chiming other songs or the alma mater as part of university celebrations or holidays. Inside the base is an automatic player that plays roll music in addition to a keyboard console that is used on special occasions. By 1945, the bell carillon was converted into an electronic system and modernized in 1966. For many years, the Alabama organ professor Warren Hutton served as the carillonneur for memorial services and special events, and today the manual organ is played by both university faculty and students.

Walk of Fame
Surrounding the tower is the Walk of Fame, where captains of the football team have placed their hand and footprints in cement slabs at its base since 1948.  The ceremony occurs annually as part of the A-Day festivities, when previous season captains are honored.

The names inscribed on the Walk of Fame include:

 1947: Harry Gilmer, John Wozniak
 1948: Billy Cadenhead, Ray Richeson
 1949: Billy Cadenhead, Ed Holdnak, Doug Lockridge
 1950: Ed Salem, Mike Mizerany
 1951: Jack Brown, Harold Lutz
 1952: Bobby Marlow, Bobby Wilson
 1953: Ralph Carrigan, Bud Willis
 1954: Thomsa Tharp, Sid Youngleman
 1955: Nick Germanos
 1956: Jim Cunningham, Max Kelly, Wes Thomas
 1957: Jim Loftin, Clay Walls
 1958: Bobby Jackson, Dave Sington, Bobby Smith
 1959: Jim Belvins, Don Cochran, Marlin Dyess
 1960: Bobby Boylston, Leon Fuller
 1961: Billy Neighbors, Pat Trammell
 1962: Lee Roy Jordan, Jimmy Sharpe
 1963: Not awarded
 1964: Steve Allen, Benny Nelson
 1965: Joe Namath, Ray Ogden
 1966: Richard Cole, Ray Perkins, Steve Sloan
 1967: Bobby Johns, Kenny Stabler
 1968: Mike Hall, Donnie Sutton
 1969: Danny Ford, Alvin Samples
 1970: Dave Brungard, Danny Gilbert
 1971: Johnny Musso, Robin Parkhouse
 1972: Terry Davis, John Mitchell
 1973: Wilbur Jackson, Chuck Strickland
 1974: Ricky Davis, Sylvester Croom
 1975: Lee Roy Cook, Richard Todd
 1976: Thad Flanagan, Charles Hannah
 1977: Ozzie Newsome, Mike Tucker
 1978: Marty Lyons, Tony Nathan
 1979: Don McNeal, Steve Whitman
 1980: Alan Gray, Major Ogilvie
 1981: Warren Lyles, Randy Scott
 1982: Randy Edwards, Steve Mott
 1983: Walter Lewis, Eddie Lowe
 1984: Paul Ott Carruth, Emanuel King
 1985: Thornton Chandler, Jon Hand
 1986: Cornelius Bennett, Mike Shula
 1987: Kerry Goode, Randy Rockwell
 1988: Derrick Thomas, David Smith
 1989: Marco Battle, Willie Wyatt
 1990: Philip Doyle, Gary Hollingsworth, Efrum Thomas
 1991: Siran Stacy, Robert Stewart, John Sullins, Kevin Turner
 1992: Derrick Oden, George Teague, George Wilson, Prince Wimbley
 1993: Chris Anderson, Lemanski Hall, Antonio Langham, Tobie Shiels
 1994: Jay Barker, Tommy Johnson, Tarrant Lynch, Sam Shade
 1995: Shannon Brown, Brian Burgdorf, Tony Johnson, John Walters
 1996: John Causey, Fernando Davis
 1997: Curtis Alexander, Paul Pickett, Rod Rutledge, Deshea Townsend
 1998: Calvin Hall, John David Phillips, Daniel Pope, Kelvin Sigler, Travis Smith
 1999: Shaun Alexander, Cornelius Griffin, Miguel Merritt, Ryan Pflugner, Chris Samuels
 2000: Paul Hogan, Bradley Ledbetter, Kenny Smith
 2001: Jarret Johnson, Terry Jones, Jr., Saleem Rasheed, Tyler Watts, Andrew Zow
 2002: Lane Bearden, Ahmaad Galloway, Jarret Johnson, Kenny King, Kindal Moorehead, Tyler Watts
 2003: Derrick Pope, Shaud Williams
 2004: Todd Bates, Wesley Britt
 2005: Brodie Croyle, DeMeco Ryans
 2006: Le'Ron McClain, Juwan Simpson
 2007: Antoine Caldwell, Rashad Johnson, Darren Mustin
 2008: John Parker Wilson, Rashad Johnson, Antoine Caldwell
 2009: Javier Arenas, Mike Johnson, Rolando McClain
 2010: Greg McElroy, Dont'a Hightower, Mark Barron
 2011: Mark Barron, Dont'a Hightower, Trent Richardson
 2012: Barrett Jones, Damion Square, Chance Warmack
 2013: A. J. McCarron, C. J. Mosley, Kevin Norwood
 2014: Amari Cooper, Jalston Fowler, Blake Sims
 2015: Jake Coker, Derrick Henry, Ryan Kelly, Reggie Ragland
 2016: Jonathan Allen, Reuben Foster, Eddie Jackson, Cam Robinson
 2017: Minkah Fitzpatrick, Rashaan Evans, Shaun Dion Hamilton, Bradley Bozeman
 2018: Damien Harris, Hale Hentges, Christian Miller, Ross Pierschbacher
 2019: Anfernee Jennings, Xavier McKinney, DeVonta Smith, Tua Tagovailoa
 2020: Landon Dickerson, Mac Jones, Alex Leatherwood, DeVonta Smith
 2021: Will Anderson Jr., Phidarian Mathis, Evan Neal, Bryce Young
 2022: Will Anderson Jr., Jordan Battle, Bryce Young

References

Towers completed in 1929
Bell towers in the United States
Carillons
Towers in Alabama
University of Alabama
Buildings and structures in Tuscaloosa, Alabama
Art Deco architecture in Alabama